
Laguna Portia is a lake in the Iténez Province, Beni Department, Bolivia. At an elevation of 200 m, its surface area is 28 km².

Lakes of Beni Department